This is a list of professional wrestlers who currently wrestle for Pro Wrestling Noah, as well as a list of notable alumni. The current roster consists of the Home Unit (those under exclusive contract), freelancers, and gaijins.

Wrestlers
Personnel is organized below by their role in Pro Wrestling Noah. Their ring name is on the left and their real name is on the right when known. Anybody inactive for a considerable amount of time is acknowledged. This list also acknowledges which unit a wrestler is a part of. "(L)" also indicates the leader of the group when one is designated.

, there are 5 central units in Noah:
 Main unit
 Kongo
 Marufuji-gun (temporary)
 Los Perros del Mal de Japón
 Stinger
 Sugiura-gun

There is also a sub-group of the main unit which is regarded as a stable: Funky Express

Heavyweight wrestlers

Junior heavyweight wrestlers

Corporate staff

Alumni

Native

Masashi Aoyagi
Jun Akiyama
Atsushi Aoki
Satoru Asako
Masahiro Chono
Naruki Doi
Haruka Eigen
Minoru Fujita
Makoto Hashi
Shinya Hashimoto
Ikuto Hidaka
Genba Hirayanagi (Tsutomu Hirayanagi)
Tamon Honda
DJ Nira
B×B Hulk
Takashi Iizuka
Masao Inoue
Shinya Ishikawa
Taiji Ishimori
Akihiko Ito
Junji Izumida (Ryukaku Izumida)
Masahito Kakihara
Yoshinobu Kanemaru
Kishin Kawabata (Teru Kawabata)
Toshiaki Kawada
Tsuyoshi Kikuchi
Kenta
Kenta Kobashi
Shuji Kondo
Mitsuharu Misawa
Kento Miyahara
Mitsuo Momota
Takeshi Morishima
Keiji Mutoh
Yuji Nagata
Takashi Okita
Takao Omori
Ippei Ota (Yoshinori Ota)
Takeshi Rikio
Takuma Sano
Kensuke Sasaki
Kentaro Shiga
Suwa
Kotaro Suzuki
Minoru Suzuki
Taichi
Taka Michinoku
El Desperado
Tatsuhito Takaiwa
Shingo Takagi
Yoshihiro Takayama
Masato Tanaka
Hiroshi Tanahashi
Akira Taue
Genichiro Tenryu
Toru Yano
Shiro Tomoyose
Masato Yoshino
Takuya Nomura
Masato Inaba
Kappa Kozou
Kaji Tomato
Rising Hayato

Gaijin

A. C. H.
Lance Archer
Bram
Jay Briscoe
Mark Briscoe
D'Lo Brown
Buchanan
Colt Cabana
Brian Cage
Claudio Castagnoli
Andy Dalton
Bryan Danielson
Robbie E
Eddie Edwards
Bobby Fish
Juventud Guerrera
Jack Gamble
Jon Webb
Jonah Rock
Hanson
Shane Haste
Slex
Chris Hero
Samoa Joe
Low Ki
Magnus
Ricky Marvin
Nigel McGuinness
Michael Modest
Donovan Morgan
Mikey Nicholls
Moose
Randy Reign
Davey Richards
Rocky Romero
Raymond Rowe
Zack Sabre Jr.
Scorpio
Richard Slinger
Bison Smith
Davey Boy Smith Jr.
Matt Striker
Roderick Strong
Super Crazy
Vader
Keith Walker
Doug Williams
Cody Hall
Marshall Von Erich
Ross Von Erich
Dante Leon

Joshi talent

Kana
Sawako Shimono

Notes

References

External links
Pro Wrestling NOAH official website (in Japanese)

Pro Wrestling Noah
Lists of professional wrestling personnel